The canton of Mirepoix (French: Canton de Mirepoix) is an administrative division of the Ariège department, southern France. Its borders were not modified at the French canton reorganisation which came into effect in March 2015. Its seat is in Mirepoix.

Composition 
As of 2015, the canton consists of the 35 following communes:

References

Cantons of Ariège (department)